Antidesma bunius is a species of fruit tree in the family Phyllanthaceae. It is native to Southeast Asia and northern Australia. Its common Philippine name and other names include bignay, bugnay or bignai, Chinese-laurel,  Queensland-cherry, salamander-tree, wild cherry, and currant tree.

Description 

It is a variable plant which may be short and shrubby or tall and erect, approaching  in height. They are attached to the twigs of the tree with short petioles, creating a dense canopy.

The species is dioecious, with male and female flowers growing on separate trees. The flowers have a strong, somewhat unpleasant scent. The staminate flowers are arranged in small bunches and the pistillate flowers grow on long racemes which will become the long strands of fruit. They are white when immature and gradually turn red, then black.

Each bunch of fruits ripens unevenly, so the fruits in a bunch are all different colors. The skin of the fruit has red juice, while the white pulp has colorless juice. The fruit contains a light-colored seed. The fruit has a sour taste similar to that of the cranberry when immature, and a tart but sweet taste when ripe.

There is an inverse correlation between the ability to taste phenylthiocarbamide and bitterness in A. bunius.

Distribution and habitat

It is native to Southeast Asia and northern Australia, found in rainforests and semi-evergreen tropical forests. It is often grown as a backyard fruit tree in Java.

Toxicity
The roots of specimens growing in Africa are poisonous. Parts of the plant besides the fruit may be toxic.

Uses
The tree is cultivated across the tropics. The fruits are edible raw and most often used for making wine and tea, in addition to jams and jellies.

See also
 Antidesma montanum

References

External links
Purdue New Crops Profile
Antidesma Species Accounts
Wild Cherry Tea PhenQGuide.net
Getting To Know The Bignay Tree CitraRespati.eu.org

bunius
Flora of Nepal